Here is a list of current fighters in the Road FC (Road Fighting Championship).

Each fight record has four categories: wins, losses, draws, and no-contests (NC). All fight records in this article are displayed in that order, with fights resulting in a no-contest listed in parentheses. Records below are retrieved from Tapoloyg's website.

Fighters

Openweight

Light Heavyweight

Middleweight

Lightweight

Featherweight

Bantamweight

Flyweight

Women's Strawweight

Women's Atomweight

See also 
List of Road FC champions 
List of Road FC events
List of current UFC fighters
List of current ACA fighters
List of current Bellator fighters
List of current Brave CF fighters 
List of current Combate Global fighters
List of current Invicta FC fighters
List of current KSW fighters
List of current ONE fighters
List of current PFL fighters
List of current Rizin FF fighters

References

External links
 About Tapology Rankings tapology.com
 Road FC fighters roadfc.com

Road Fighting Championship
Lists of mixed martial artists